Culprit (French: Le coupable) is a 1937 French drama film directed by Raymond Bernard and starring Pierre Blanchar, Gabriel Signoret and Suzet Maïs. It is a remake of the 1917 silent film Culprit, which was based on a novel by François Coppée.

Partial cast
 Pierre Blanchar as Jérôme Lescuyer  
 Gabriel Signoret as Monsieur Lescuyer 
 Suzet Maïs as Marie-Louise Gaude  
 Junie Astor as Louise Donadieu  
 Palmyre Levasseur as Rosalie  
 Gilbert Gil as Jérôme Forgeat  
 Marcel André as Edouard  
 Jean Joffre as Le bâtonnier  
 Henri Échourin as Donadieu  
 Daniel Clérice as Anatole  
 Henri Richard as Le président des assises 
 Charles Fallot as Jude Nicolet  
 Pierre Finaly as Le ministre 
 Albert Gercourt as Lucas  
 Albert Malbert as L'agent  
 André Dionnet as Le petit Jérôme
 François Rodon as Le petit Anatole 
 Madeleine Ozeray as Thérèse Forgeat  
 Marguerite Moreno as Mme Gaude

References

Bibliography 
 Dudley Andrew. Mists of Regret: Culture and Sensibility in Classic French Film. Princeton University Press, 1995.

External links 
 

1937 films
French drama films
1937 drama films
1930s French-language films
Films directed by Raymond Bernard
French black-and-white films
Remakes of French films
Sound film remakes of silent films
1930s French films